Idiosoma manstridgei is a species of spider in the family Idiopidae, found in Australia.

Taxonomy
Idiosoma manstridgei was first described by Reginald Innes Pocock in 1897, as Anidiops manstridgei. It was transferred to Idiosoma in 2017. (The genus Anidiops is no longer recognized.)

See also
 List of Idiopidae species

References

External links

Idiopidae
Spiders of Australia
Spiders described in 1897